The Jersey Larks are a defunct professional ice hockey team which played in the Eastern Hockey League during the 1960-61 season. Based in Cherry Hill, New Jersey, they played their home games out of the Haddonfield Ice House.

Coached by Ray Miron in their only season of play, the Larks posted a regular-season record of  24 wins, 39 losses, and 1 tie, to qualify for the playoffs, before losing in the second round.

They would move to Knoxville, Tennessee after the 1960-61 EHL season, becoming the Knoxville Knights.

References

Defunct ice hockey teams in the United States
Ice hockey clubs established in 1960
Ice hockey clubs disestablished in 1961
Ice hockey teams in New Jersey
1960 establishments in New Jersey
1961 disestablishments in New Jersey